Chourjit Singh, also known as Charajit Singh, was a Meitei King and a Maharaja of Kangleipak, who ruled between 1806 and 1812.

See also
List of Manipuri kings
Manipur (princely state)

References

Bibliography
Hodson, Thomas Callan.The Meitheis. Harvard University, 1908.

Meitei royalty
Hindu monarchs